The IV Corps was a unit of the Finnish Army during the Continuation War. During the 1941 Finnish invasion of the Karelian Isthmus, it encircled three Soviet divisions in the area south of Vyborg before being disbanded. Reconstituted in 1944, the corps was the target of the spearhead of the Soviet Vyborg–Petrozavodsk offensive. Elements of the corps fought in the decisive Battle of Tali-Ihantala at the end of the war.

1941 invasion of the Karelian Isthmus 

Commanded by Lieutenant General Karl Lennart Oesch, IV Corps was formed around the headquarters of the peace-time II Corps. Consisting of the 4th, 8th, 10th and 12th divisions, IV Corps took part in the Finnish invasion of the Karelian Isthmus. It was initially tasked with the defense of the southernmost sector of the Finno-Soviet border on the shore of the Gulf of Finland. In this role, the corps was subordinated directly to the Finnish General HQ.

Following the Soviet 23rd Army's withdrawal from Vyborg, parts of IV Corps started to pursue them towards the pre-Winter War border. Concurrently, the 8th Division conducted an amphibious landing to Lokhaniemi, south of Vyborg. This, together with a by-land envelopment conducted by the 4th and 12th divisions, resulted in the pocketing of the Soviet 43rd, 115th and 123rd divisions following the Battle of Porlampi. This was the largest pocket created by the Finns in either the Winter War or the Continuation War, resulting in the capture of some 3000 prisoners of war, including the commander of the Soviet 43rd Division, Major General Kirpichnikov. On 25 February 1942, the General HQ ordered the corps to be renamed as Isthmus Group (Finnish: Kannaksen Ryhmä).

1944 Soviet offensive 

The corps was reformed on 16 February 1944 under the command of Lieutenant General Taavetti Laatikainen on the western Karelian isthmus. Consisting initially of only two divisions, the reconstituted IV Corps was hit by the spearhead of the Soviet Vyborg–Petrozavodsk offensive on 10 June 1944. The attack immediately broke the Finnish line, and forced IV Corps to fall back to the VT-line, which the Soviets reached on 11 June 1944. On June 17, the Finnish forces were ordered to fall back to the VKT-line while fighting a delaying action. There, IV Corps took part in the decisive Battle of Tali–Ihantala. By this point, the corps had been reinforced with more divisions, including the Armoured Division. At the start of the ceasefire that would lead to the Moscow Armistice, the corps consisted of the 3rd, 4th, 6th, 11th and 18th divisions.

See also
 Finnish IV Corps (Winter War)
 List of Finnish corps in the Continuation War

Notes

References 

 
 
 
 
 

Continuation War
Military units and formations of Finland in World War II